CCSR may refer to:

 Canadian Society for the Study of Religion
 Center for Climate Systems Research
 Center for Clinical Sciences Research
 Cherra Companyganj State Railways